I'll Be is a compilation album by Reba McEntire, released October 9, 2000, on MCA Nashville. The album was only released in Europe.The album peaked at #134 on the UK Albums Chart. This album has every song from her 21st studio album Starting Over, except "You Keep Me Hangin' On".

Track listing

Sales chart positions

Certifications and sales

References

External links
[ I'll Be] at Allmusic

Reba McEntire compilation albums
2001 compilation albums
MCA Records compilation albums